Sir Thomas Fairfax ( – 1520) was an owner of Gilling Castle, near Gilling East, North Riding of Yorkshire, England.

Sir Thomas Fairfax (father)
Fairfax's father, also named Thomas, was presumably a supporter of the House of York in the Wars of the Roses. His original home was near the site of the Battle of Towton. Based on the 1349 marriage between Margaret de Etton and their ancestor, a third Thomas Fairfax of Walton, the elder Thomas Fairfax successfully claimed the ownership of the Gilling Estate during two inquisitions, the first of which was in 1489.

The elder Thomas Fairfax married Elizabeth, daughter of Robert Sherburne of Lancashire. Their son, the younger Thomas Fairfax, was the eldest of nine children; his brothers' names were Richard, Robert and John, and his sisters were Jane, Elizabeth, Isabel, Anne and Dorothy.

Career
In 1513, the younger Fairfax served with Henry VIII on his expedition to Artois. He was knighted when the city of Tournai (now in Belgium) surrendered to the king. Upon his father's death in 1505, the younger Thomas Fairfax inherited the Gilling estate.

Marriage and family
The younger Fairfax's wife was Agnes (or Anne) Gascoigne, daughter of Lady Margaret Percy, the daughter of Henry Percy, 3rd Earl of Northumberland and through him, a descendant of Edward III. Agnes's father was Sir William Gascoigne "the Younger" of York, a descendant of another Sir William Gascoigne.

Fairfax had six sons and six daughters.
 Upon his death, he left his estate to his son Nicholas.
 William was Nicholas's twin. He settled at Bury St. Edmunds and is buried in Walsingham. He married and had John Fairfax, Master of the Great Hospital in Norwich, who married Mary Birch, daughter of George Birch, Sheriff of Norwich in 1604, Mayor of Norwich in 1621, and had issue, Benjamin Fairfax, of Rumburgh, ejected 1662 (1592 - 1675), married to Sarah Galliard, daughter of Roger Galliard, of Ashwell Thorpe, Co. Norfolk, and had issue, Benjamin Fairfax, of Halesworth, Co. Suffolk (? - 1708), married to Bridget Stringer, daughter of Walter Stringer, of Chester, and had issue, Sarah Fairfax (1654 - 1688), married in 1675 to John Meadows, Vicar of Ousden (ejected 1662) (Chattisham, near Ipswich, Suffolk, 7 April 1622 - Bury St. Edmunds, buried in Stowmarket, 1 March 1697), son of Daniel Meadows (Rushmere, 1577 - 7 September 1659, buried Chatisham) and wife Elizabeth Smith (?- 1678) and paternal grandson of William Meadows and wife Agnes ... (? - 1678), and had issue
 His third son, Thomas, became a priest in the Church of England.
 His other sons were named Miles of Gilling, Guy and Robert.

A celebrated  member of the Fairfax family is  Thomas Fairfax, 3rd Lord Fairfax of Cameron (17 January 1612 – 12 November 1671) – the distant cousin of Sir Thomas Fairfax (Gilling) – who  was a general and Parliamentary commander-in-chief during the English Civil War.

Records reveal that in his will, dated 26 November 1520, Sir Thomas Fairfax names his wife Anne (Agnes) – "Dame Anne Fairfax, my wif" – as an executrix and she is granted administration 11 April 1521.

References
 

Knights Bachelor
People from Ryedale (district)
English monarchy
Thomas
16th-century English people
15th-century English people
1520 deaths
Year of birth uncertain